The Fangyan Formation is a geologic formation in China (Dongyang). It is made up of mainly conglomerates. It preserves dinosaur fossils dating back to the Late Cretaceous.

Paleofauna

Dongyangosaurus sinensis

References 

Geologic formations of China